The Inverted Hungarian Opening or Tayler Opening is an uncommon chess opening that starts with the moves:
1. e4 e5
2. Nf3 Nc6
3. Be2

It is so-named because the position of White's bishop on e2 resembles that of Black's bishop on e7 in the Hungarian Defense. "This opening is also known as the Inverted Hanham and was played most prominently by Tartakower against Bogoljubow at London 1922."

Description
The Inverted Hungarian is even rarer than the already very uncommon Hungarian Defense, although it is perfectly  for White. It may appeal to White players who wish to avoid extensively analyzed double king pawn openings such as the Ruy Lopez, and to those who favor defensive positional maneuvering battles as also often result from the Hungarian Defense. With the advantage of the first move, White has greater latitude to play moves that are not objectively the strongest without incurring disadvantage.

Since White's third move 3.Be2 makes no threats, there are many satisfactory replies for Black. If White plays a setup resembling the Black side of the Hanham Variation of the Philidor Defense (3...Nf6 4.d3 d5 5.Nbd2), the opening is sometimes called the Inverted Hanham Opening.

After 3...Nf6, John Tayler introduced the line 4.d4 and published analysis in Chess, February–March 1981.

See also
 List of chess openings
 List of chess openings named after places

Citations

Bibliography

Chess openings